"Popular" is a song by Australian musical duo the Veronicas for their second studio album, Hook Me Up (2007). Produced by Toby Gad, it was released as the album's final single on 11 October 2008 as a digital download. Written by the Veronicas—twin sisters Lisa and Jessica Origliasso—together with Beni Barca and Toby Gad, the track was recorded in Los Angeles, California. The song pokes fun at people with privileged lifestyles.

"Popular" received mostly positive reviews from critics, who praised the fun lyrics and named it a highlight of the album. The recording was released to radio on the week of 12 October 2008 and peaked at number 11 on the Australian Airplay Chart.

Writing and inspiration
"Popular" was recorded at the Origliasso's living room in Los Angeles, California, with Gad producing the track. In an interview with Cameron Adams of Herald Sun Lisa elaborated on the song's subject matter, "We wanted something different. We wanted to take the piss out of celebrity life. We thought it was hysterical." When asked about the rapped verses in the recording, Jessica replied, "I'm rapping! I'm doing it for all the unrhythmic white chicks in Australia! With a really thick Australian accent!"

Reception
Emily Mackay of NME called "Popular" "plain old up-yours fun",<ref>{{cite news|title=Album review: The Veronicas – Hook Me Up|last=Mackay|first=Emily|date=2 June 2009|publisher=IPC Media|work=NME|location=UK}}</ref> while K. Ross Hoffman of AllMusic said the Australian accent was used to "excellent effect" in the rapped verses. Ben Norman of About.com found the lyrics "humorous" and named the track one of his favourites from the album, calling it, "Upbeat, very poppy, but eventually the complete inanity of it grew on me... Don't discount this song due to the extreme contrast it poses to the rest of the disc or their previous material. Give it a shot, you might just like it." Similarly, Nick Levine of Digital Spy declared "Popular", along with "Untouched" and "This Is How It Feels", as one of the highlights on the album. Evan Sawdey of PopMatters was impressed with the song which made for a "glorious" end to Hook Me Up, an album he felt was full of hooks. He said, "The gloriously trashy "Popular" seems fueled entirely by dance floor sweat, being both ridiculous and confident in equal measure."

David James Young of Sputnikmusic compared "Popular" to an inbred lovechild of Peaches and Princess Superstar, saying, "What can be said about this one? Basically, if Peaches went out and got completely hammered with Princess Superstar and they managed to have some kind of inbred lovechild with "Best Damn Thing"-era Avril Lavigne as the midwife, it would probably come out sounding something like this. And believe me, this is definitely not a compliment. Talking about the song, the girls say that the song is "taking the piss out of famous people". However, in a similar vein to Good Charlotte atrocity "I Just Wanna Live", you simply cannot tell and it comes off as vain and cheap."

The recording is the only single of the Veronicas to date not to chart within the top 100 of the Australian ARIA Singles Chart. It peaked at number 11 on the Australian Airplay Chart.

Track listing
iTunes single
 "Popular" – 2:44

Credits and personnel
Credits are adapted from the Hook Me Up'' album liner notes.

Recording
 The Veronicas living room (Los Angeles, California)

Personnel
 Songwriting – Jessica Origliasso, Lisa Origliasso, Beni Barca, Toby Gad
 Production – Toby Gad
 Instruments and programming – Toby Gad
 Mixing – Toby Gad
 Vocals – Jessica Origliasso, Lisa Origliasso

Charts

Release history

References

The Veronicas songs
2008 singles
Song recordings produced by Toby Gad
Songs written by Jessica Origliasso
Songs written by Lisa Origliasso
Songs written by Toby Gad